Scilla amoena, the star hyacinth or squill, is a species of flowering plant plant in the genus Scilla.

Description 

Scilla amoena (star hyacinth or squill) is a perennial, bulbous herbaceous plant that grows to heights of 15–25  centimeters. It is a geophyte that forms bulbs, from which new growth appears in spring. The four to five (rarely three) basal, obtuse leaves are 20–30 centimeters long and 1.2–1.8 cm. wide, light green and often reddish below, and longer than the scape. 

There are one to three flower stems, that are angular and compressed. The bracts are 1-2.5 mm long. About 3–6 (rarely 1–15) upright flowers form a loose, racemose inflorescence, spreading into a star. The perianth has tepals that are light blue with a dark central vein, and whitish at the base, but a darker blue in their interior, and are 10–20 mm long by 4–5 mm wide. The pedicels are 10–20 mm in length and longer than the perianth. The seeds are more or less spherical, with a diameter of 3 mm.

The chromosome number is 2n = 12.

Taxonomy 

First formally described by Carl Linnaeus in 1753, as one of eight Scilla species.

Etymology 

The specific epithet amoena derives from the Latin, amoenus, indicating beautiful.

Distribution and habitat 

The natural range of Scilla amoena is most likely northern Turkey, but is naturalised in parts of southern Europe, including France, The Balkans and Romania, and also central Europe, including Bavaria, Lake Constance, Styria and Silesia. It is found in gardens, meadows and mixed deciduous forests.

Ecology 

The plant is proteranthous (leaves appear before the flower stems). The flowering period is from March to May. Pollination occurs through self-pollination or is entomogamous (by insects). Seed dispersal is by ants (myrmecochory).

Cultivation 

Occasionally used as an ornamental garden plant.

References

Bibliography 

 , see also Species Plantarum

External links 

amoena
Flora of Europe
Garden plants of Europe
Plants described in 1753
Taxa named by Carl Linnaeus